Andrey Anatolyevich Shumilin (9 March 1970 – 8 June 2022) was a Russian wrestler. He competed in the 1996 Summer Olympics and came fourth in the super-heavyweight freestyle event.

Wrestling career
Shumilian was born in Kaliningrad, Russian SFSR. In the 1980 his father brought him to junior's sports school. At 16 years old he was already a master of sports of the USSR. In the 1986 he won the USSR championship and the Juniors' World championship. The next year Shumilin repeated his success – he was already double Juniors' World champion. In 1989 he was junior's European champion. From 1990 he was a regular member of the Russian national wrestling team.

References

External links
 
 International youth free style wrestling tournament for Andrej Shumilin’s prizes
 

1970 births
2022 deaths
Immanuel Kant Baltic Federal University alumni
Olympic wrestlers of Russia
Wrestlers at the 1996 Summer Olympics
Soviet sport wrestlers
Russian male sport wrestlers
World Wrestling Championships medalists
European Wrestling Championships medalists
Sportspeople from Kaliningrad
20th-century Russian people